Annan in Dumfriesshire was a royal burgh that returned one commissioner to the Parliament of Scotland and to the Convention of Estates.

After the Acts of Union 1707, Annan, Dumfries, Kirkcudbright, Lochmaben and Sanquhar formed the Dumfries district of burghs, returning one member between them to the House of Commons of Great Britain.

List of burgh commissioners

 1661–62, 1665 convention, 1667 convention: Hew Sinclair of Englishtoun, provost 
 1669–74: William Grahame of Blastwood 
 1678 convention: David Johnston, bailie 
 1681–82: James Carruthers 
 1685–1686, 1689 convention, 1689–1695: Bryce Blair, former provost (died c.1698) 
 1698–1702, 1702–1707: William Johnstone of Sheenes

References

See also
 List of constituencies in the Parliament of Scotland at the time of the Union

Constituencies of the Parliament of Scotland (to 1707)
Constituencies disestablished in 1707
1707 disestablishments in Scotland
History of Dumfries and Galloway
Politics of Dumfries and Galloway